Old Franconian may mean:
Old Frankish language
Old Low Franconian